Kenema Government Secondary School is a government-sponsored all boys  secondary school located in Kenema, Sierra Leone. The school was founded in 1952 by the Sierra Leone government to educate the children of Kenema. The school is regarded as one of the elite secondary schools in the country.

Notable alumni
Paul Kpaka, Sierra Leonean football star
jb Rogers, former minister of finance
.

External links
http://www.feedsfarm.com/article/ef70d8c29111d661a73ab99f07fb99b6061718aa.html

Secondary schools in Sierra Leone
Kenema
Educational institutions established in 1952
1952 establishments in Sierra Leone